The five-hole is an ice hockey term for the space between a goaltender's legs. The name and its first recorded usage was in 1976 by Flyer Reggie Leach The phrases through the five-hole and gone five-hole are used when a player scores by shooting the puck into the goal between the goaltender's legs. The term is also used in basketball, association football, field hockey, and lacrosse.

Origin

When a goaltender stands in the net in the ready position, there are five open areas (and two closed) that the goalie must cover.

Glove side, high  This area is defined by the goaltender's arm and glove on the bottom, mask on the inside, and the post and top of the goal on the outside.
Glove side, low  This area is defined by the goaltender's arm and glove on the top, the ice on the bottom, and the outside post of the goal. During a butterfly-style save, this area is closed off completely and the glove is typically stacked on top of the leg pad as the leg is extended to cover the post.
Stick side, high  This area is defined by the goal post, top of the goal, and the goalie's arm and stick. The top half of the goaltender's stick is held in this area but is not commonly used for stopping the puck.
Stick side, low  This area is the lower half of the stick side, defined by the stick and arm, the ice, and the outer post of the goal. During a butterfly-style save, this area is also covered by the leg pad with the blocker stacked on top to protect against low shots. When a goaltender is standing, the paddle of the stick (i.e. its handle) is used to cover this area and to deflect the puck away from the net.
Five-hole  The fifth area is between the goalie's leg pads and skates. This area is protected by the blade of the stick at all times and is closed up by the upper leg pads when the goalie is in the butterfly position.
The reason for naming this location five-hole comes from Canadian bowling, which uses 5 pins, the centremost of which is worth 5 points. This pin is often called the 5-pin. When the 5-pin is knocked down without hitting any other pins, the hole left in the middle is known as the 5-hole.

External links

References

Ice hockey terminology